The Bruneian records in swimming are the fastest ever performances of swimmers from Brunei, which are recognised and ratified by the Brunei Amateur Swimming Association (BASA).

All records were set in finals unless noted otherwise.

Long Course (50 m)

Men

Women

Short Course (25 m)

Men

Women

Mixed relay

References
General
 Bruneian Long Course Records
 Bruneian Short Course Records

Specific

External links
 BASA web site

Brunei
Records
Swimming